Kwon Eun-hee (Korean: 權垠希) (born 15 February 1974) is a South Korean politician, police officer and lawyer. She was floor leader of the People Party in the South Korean National Assembly.

See also 

 List of members of the National Assembly (South Korea), 2020–2024

References 

Living people
1974 births
South Korean whistleblowers
21st-century South Korean women politicians
21st-century South Korean politicians
South Korean police officers
Members of the National Assembly (South Korea)
Female members of the National Assembly (South Korea)
People's Party (South Korea, 2016) politicians
South Korean Roman Catholics